The Chinese Athletics Championships is an annual track and field competition which serves as the national championship for the People's Republic of China. It is organised by Chinese Athletic Association, China's national governing body for the sport of athletics. The event was first organised in 1910 as a men's only championship and women's championship events were introduced in 1959 – much later than at the Chinese National Games, which had featured women nearly thirty years earlier.

It is the highest level national event for China's track and field athletes, with the exception of the athletics competition at the National Games held every four years. The national competition features the full complement of athletics events that are present on the Olympic programme. The marathon and race walking events are typically held at separate times, but have in the past been incorporated into the main track and field competition. Sometimes men's and women's championships are held discretely. The event typically lasts three to four days and is held near the start of the global outdoor track and field season in June or July, or at the end of that season in September or October.

References

 
Athletics
National athletics competitions
Athletics competitions in China
Recurring sporting events established in 1910